9-foot Stake  is a coral reef located within the Florida Keys National Marine Sanctuary.  It lies to the south of Key West, and is west of Marker 32 reef.  Unlike many reefs in the Sanctuary, it is not within a Sanctuary Preservation Area (SPA).

The reef gets its name from a fallen telephone pole within the reef.

Gallery

References
 NOAA National Marine Sanctuary Maps, Florida Keys East
 NOAA Map of buoys at 9-foot Stake
 NOAA Navigational Chart 11441

Coral reefs of the Florida Keys